The 1981 Detroit Lions season was their 52nd in the league. The team failed to improve upon their previous season's record of 9–7, winning eight games. The Lions started off the first four games even at 2–2. In the fourth game of the season, starting quarterback Gary Danielson suffered a dislocated wrist, which ended his season. Backup quarterback Jeff Komlo finished the game and was named the starter for the next week. In the next two games, Komlo struggled. The Lions lost both of those games. Head Coach Monte Clark made the decision to give third-string quarterback Eric Hipple start on a Monday Night game against the Chicago Bears. In front of approximately 71,000 fans, Clark's gamble paid off as the Lions defeated the Bears 48–17.

Star halfback Billy Sims continued to play solid football, amassing 1,888 total yards in total offense while scoring a team-high 14 touchdowns. The Lions had a chance to win the division on the last day against Tampa Bay, but lost and finished in second place in the NFC Central with an 8–8 record. The team missed the playoffs for the eleventh straight season.

Offseason

NFL Draft

Roster

Schedule

Week 13

Standings

References

Detroit Lions seasons
Detroit Lions
Detroit Lions